Eugene Raybold "Roy" Elsh (March 1, 1891 – November 12, 1978) was an outfielder in Major League Baseball. He played for the Chicago White Sox.

Born in Penns Grove, New Jersey, Elsh attended Penns Grove High School.

References

External links

1891 births
1978 deaths
Major League Baseball outfielders
Chicago White Sox players
Baseball players from New Jersey
People from Penns Grove, New Jersey
Sportspeople from Salem County, New Jersey